Persephone is a steel logging tug used in the filming of the CBC Television series The Beachcombers. Built as a small tug named John Henry, it is today preserved as a museum ship in the town of Gibsons, British Columbia.

The tug was built in 1965 for Harry "Smitty" Smith, of Smith's Marina in Gibsons, by local boat builder John F Gooldrup. As John Henry, the tug was used as a small tug and work boat in the waters of the Sunshine Coast. In 1972, the vessel was chartered by CBC Television to portray a log salvage boat owned by the central character Nick Adonidas and his partner Jesse Jim in the series The Beachcombers. The tug's television name, taken from the Greek goddess Persephone, reflects Nick Adonidas' Greek heritage. The tug appeared in most episodes of the long-running series. Her battered, black hull became one of the show's iconic backdrops. Despite her small size and modest speed, her strength, seaworthiness and reliability made Persephone something of a character in her own right, often contrasted with the fast and aggressive jet boat piloted by Relic, Nick Adonidas' longtime rival.

After the end of the series in 1990, the engine was removed, and Harry Smith donated the vessel to the Town of Gibsons in 1991. The tug was kept for several years at the town public works yard. In 2003 the Sunshine Coast Museum & Archives Society in Gibsons took ownership of the tug for restoration. John Henry was removed from the vessel registry on June 13, 2003 as a team of volunteers restored the tug to its appearance in the television series as Persephone. The tug was transferred back to the Town of Gibsons in 2007 after restoration was complete. It was agreed that the vessel would not be used in the water again but would be prominently displayed in the town. A location was chosen at an intersection of Gower Point Road, just down the road from the Sunshine Coast Museum & Archives which continues to maintain a display about the show's production, and just up the road from Molly's Reach, the cafe building which featured prominently in the series. Persephone was installed by crane on a special landscaped cradle in July 2007 during the town's annual Sea Cavalcade celebrations. In 2020 the vacant lot was slated for redevelopment, and a new home needed to be found.  In December 2020 B.C. Ferries committed funding for restoration and a new building.

See also
Museum ship
List of museum ships

References

External links
 "Re: The Beachcombers Intro and The Persephone", YouTube Video of 2007 Installation at Gibsons

Tugboats of Canada
Museum ships in Canada
Museum ships in British Columbia
Water transport in British Columbia
Ships built in British Columbia
Fictional ships
Sunshine Coast (British Columbia)